Great Lakes Transmission is a natural gas pipeline that brings gas from western Canada through Minnesota, Wisconsin and Michigan before re-entering Canada.  Along the way it provides gas to ANR Pipeline.  Its FERC code is 51.

The pipeline was opened in 1967, running  between Emerson, Manitoba and St. Clair, Michigan.

The pipeline is operated by Great Lakes Gas Transmission L.P., headquartered in Houston, TX.

See also
 List of North American natural gas pipelines

References

External links
Pipeline Electronic Bulletin Board

Natural gas pipelines in the United States
Natural gas pipelines in Canada
Canada–United States relations
Natural gas pipelines in Minnesota
Natural gas pipelines in Wisconsin
Natural gas pipelines in Michigan